eLiiga is a Finnish esports league that is played in the NHL video game series. The teams competing in the tournament are real ice hockey teams that play in the Liiga, the top-tier league of Finland. The league is hosted by Liiga and Telia. Only the top-eight teams make it into the playoffs. The playoffs are played in a best-of-three series, but the final is played in a best-of-five series.

Seasons

2020 eLiiga 
The first eLiiga season was played from November 4th to December 13th in 2020. Tappara won the regular season and the playoffs. Tappara beat Jukurit 3-2 in the final series on 13 November.

2021–2022 eLiiga 
The second eLiiga season was played from December 3rd 2021 to 25th February 2022. The championship was won by HC TPS. TPS beat Vaasan Sport 3-1 in the final series. HIFK Hockey won bronze. The 2021–2022 season was sponsored by PlayStation.

Participating teams 
Every Liiga team participates in the eLiiga. List of teams:
 hREDS (HIFK)
 HPK
 Ilves
 Jukurit
 JYP
 KalPa
 KooKoo
 Kärpät
 Lukko
 Pelicans
 SaiPa
 Sport
 Tappara
 TPS
 PATA (Porin Ässät)

eLiiga winners

eLiiga Late Night 
eLiiga Late Night is a late night show that goes over the eLiiga games and other ice hockey games. During the 2021–2022 season, the eLiiga Late Night was hosted by Joonas "Lärvinen" Järvinen and Ville Uusitalo, former captain of Porin Ässät.

References 

Esports leagues